The 1948 Saint Louis Billikens football team was an American football team that represented Saint Louis University as a member of the Missouri Valley Conference (MVC) during the 1948 college football season. In its first season under head coach Joe Maniaci, the team compiled a 4–7 record (0–2 against MVC opponents), finished in last place in the conference, and was outscored by a total of 258 to 139. The team played its home games at Walsh Stadium in St. Louis.

Schedule

References

Saint Louis
Saint Louis Billikens football seasons
Saint Louis Billikens football